Le Chamossaire is a mountain part of the Alpes Vaudoises, overlooking Villars-sur-Ollon on its south face and Les Ormonts valley on its north face. It is located in the canton of Vaud. The mountain is part of Villars ski area and its summit is easily accessible from Bretaye with the Bex–Villars–Bretaye railway and then a fast chairlift. Located more east is the Petit Chamossaire shoulder accessible via a brand new chairlift.

See also
List of mountains of Switzerland accessible by public transport

References

External links

Le Chamossaire on Hikr

Bernese Alps
Mountains of the Alps
Two-thousanders of Switzerland
Mountains of the canton of Vaud
Mountains of Switzerland